Venusia' distrigaria is a moth in the family Geometridae first described by Jean Baptiste Boisduval in 1833. It is found on Madagascar.

Taxonomy
The identity and generic placement of this species are unclear.

References

Moths described in 1833
Venusia (moth)